Kyle Christy is an American football punter who is currently a free agent in the National Football League (NFL).  He played college football at the University of Florida.

Early years
Christy was born in Brownsburg, Indiana, and played football for Brownsburg High School. He was a placekicker until his junior year, when his coach asked him to try punting, as well. Christy made 5 of 8 field goals and 31 of 37 extra-point attempts as a junior. As a senior, he averaged 42 yards per punt and was named to the All-State team.

College career
Christy attended the University of Florida, where he was a member of coach Will Muschamp's Florida Gators football team. In 2011, he had 30 punts and averaged 40.9 yards per punt. He had a career-long 67-yard punt against Auburn. In the 2012 Gator Bowl, he averaged 37.3 yards on three punts, and the Gators won.

In 2012, Christy had 66 punts and averaged 45.8 yards per punt. His punting average topped the Southeastern Conference (SEC). He was named to the All-SEC first-team and was a finalist for the Ray Guy Award. In the 2013 Sugar Bowl, he averaged 41.3 yards on four punts in a loss. Christy was listed by The News-Press as the 10th best kicking teams athlete in Florida Gators history.

Professional career

Detroit Lions
On April 25, 2016, the Detroit Lions signed Christy to a four-year contract. He was waived on June 2, 2016.

See also
 List of Florida Gators football All-Americans

References

Further reading 

 Kyle Christy seeks redemption with Florida Gators, Tampa Bay Times
 Punter proves to be key weapon for UF, Orlando Sentinel
Brownsburg punting prospect: 'I still have my Peyton Manning jersey, Indianapolis Star

American football punters
Living people
Florida Gators football players
Detroit Lions players
People from Brownsburg, Indiana
Players of American football from Indiana
1992 births